Chokey Nima (born on 10 October 1975) is a former Bhutanese international footballer and also was the head coach the Bhutan national football team. He played for the national team for 12 years.

Chokey Nima led Bhutan in the first round of the AFC qualifiers of the 2018 FIFA World Cup. Bhutan had to face Sri Lanka in a two-legged match to determine which team will advance in the second round. Nima won both matches against Sri Lanka. He would not coach the national team at the second round of the qualifiers as he was only head coach in an interim capacity. Japanese coach, Norio Tsukitate succeeded him as head coach of the national team.

Statistics

Managerial

References

Bhutanese footballers
Bhutan international footballers
Living people
1975 births
20th-century births
Bhutanese football managers
Association footballers not categorized by position